Senator Miranda may refer to:

Catherine Miranda (born 1964), Arizona State Senate
Richard Miranda (politician) (born 1956), Arizona State Senate